Joseph Gardner Wilson (December 13, 1826 – July 2, 1873) was a U.S. Republican politician in the state of Oregon. A native of New Hampshire, he served as a state circuit court judge and as a justice of the Oregon Supreme Court, and was elected to the United States House of Representatives. Wilson died before assuming office in the House.

Early life
Joseph Wilson was born in Acworth, New Hampshire on December 13, 1826. His family moved to Cincinnati in Hamilton County, Ohio in 1828 and then on to a farm near Reading where Joseph attended the local schools. In 1840, he left the public schools and enrolled at Cary's Academy where he studied until 1842. In 1846, he graduated from Marietta College in Marietta, Ohio. Wilson was then employed as a teacher at Farmer's College in 1849, and then studied law at Cincinnati Law School. He graduated with his law degree in 1852 and passed the bar.

Oregon
In 1852, Joseph Wilson traveled the Oregon Trail and immigrated to the Oregon Territory. After arriving, he was appointed as clerk to the Oregon Supreme Court, serving until 1855. Wilson married Elizabeth Millar Wilson in 1854, and they had four children together. Also that year he began working for the Willamette Woolen Company as their first secretary. In 1860, he was selected to be the district attorney for Oregon’s third judicial district (Marion County), serving until 1862.

On October 17, 1862, he was appointed by Oregon Governor A. C. Gibbs to the Oregon Supreme Court to a newly created position when a fifth seat was added to the court. At that time the justices also rode circuit as trial judges, with Wilson holding court in The Dalles. Wilson won election to a full six-year term on the court in 1864, before resigning from the court in May 1870.

Congress and death
He ran for Congress in 1870, but did not win the seat. Wilson was elected as a Republican to the United States House of Representatives from Oregon in 1872 and served from March 4, 1873 until his death in Marietta, Ohio, on July 2, 1873, at the age of 46. He died while moving to Washington, DC, to assume office, just before he was scheduled to give a speech at his alma mater, Marietta College. Joseph Gardner Wilson was buried in The Dalles, Oregon, at Pioneer Cemetery. His cousin James W. Nesmith filled the vacancy in the House.

See also
List of United States Congress members who died in office (1790–1899)

Sources

1826 births
1873 deaths
People from Acworth, New Hampshire
Justices of the Oregon Supreme Court
People from The Dalles, Oregon
Marietta College alumni
Politicians from Marietta, Ohio
Oregon pioneers
Politicians from Salem, Oregon
District attorneys in Oregon
Republican Party members of the United States House of Representatives from Oregon
19th-century American politicians
Lawyers from Salem, Oregon
People from Reading, Ohio
19th-century American judges
19th-century American lawyers